Adventures in Jazz is a CBS television show that was broadcast live from January 22, 1949, to June 24, 1949, 8-8:30 Eastern Time on Fridays, showcasing jazz musicians and singers.

Guest performers came from both traditional jazz and modern jazz styles. They included Sidney Bechet, Charlier Parker, Artie Shaw, Ella Fitzgerald, Duke Ellington, Miles Davis, Charlie Parker, Count Basie and June Christy made appearances on the short-lived series, with a total of 23 episodes.

Radio personality Fred Robbins hosted the series premiere on Saturday, January 22, 1949 (the show moved to its regular time-slot on the following Friday) but left due to other commitments.  He was replaced by DJ Bill Williams, and later bandleader Bobby Sherwood, until his return on the April 29 episode. Original host Fred Robbins explained some of the vernacular of the genres to the viewing public.

Robert L. Bach produced the program, and Ralph Levy directed it.

Adventures in Jazz was a sustaining program.

References

External links

CBS original programming
1949 American television series debuts
1949 American television series endings
1940s American television series
American music television series